John O'Connell (June 24, 1826 – August 20, 1909) was a U.S. shoe manufacture, and political figure who was a member of the Board of Selectmen and the third Mayor of Marlborough, Massachusetts.

Early life 
O'Connell was born on June 24, 1826, in Middleton, Ireland.

Political Career 
In 1893, O'Connell succeeded George A. Howe as the third Mayor of Marlborough, Massachusetts.

Death
O'Connell died on August 20, 1909.

References
 Bigelow, Ella A. Historical Reminiscences of Marlborough Massachusetts. Marlborough, MA: Times Company, Printers, Pgs. 113-116 (1910).

Notes

 
 

1826 births
Mayors of Marlborough, Massachusetts
Massachusetts city council members
1909 deaths
Massachusetts Republicans
19th-century American politicians